The Montello River is a river in central Wisconsin that is a tributary to the Fox River. It starts near Harrisville and flows through Montello. The river is dammed there, where it forms  Lake Montello.

References

Rivers of Wisconsin